Luzzara is a comune in the province of Reggio Emilia, in Emilia-Romagna, Italy.  It is located at the northern end of the province, on the right bank of the river Po.

Luzzara is the birthplace of the composer Maurizio Cazzati and film director and writer Cesare Zavattini. It is also the place where the Battle of Luzzara in the Spanish War of Succession was fought.

Frazioni
Arginello, Bacchiellino, Borgo Po, Buca Bertona, Cantone, Casoni, Codisotto, Corghe, Cugini, Delfina, Negre, San Carlo, Vergari Alti, Vergari Bassi, Villa Superiore, Villarotta.

Bounding communes

Dosolo 
Gonzaga
Guastalla
Reggiolo
Suzzara

Population history

References

External links
Official website of the Commune of Luzzara (in Italian)

Cities and towns in Emilia-Romagna